Vráž may refer to:

Vráž (Benešov District)
Vráž (Beroun District)
Vráž (Písek District)

See also
Stanko Vraz (1810–1851), Slovene-born Croatian poet